The 32nd New York Infantry Regiment, also known as the "1st California Regiment", was an infantry regiment that served in the Union Army during the American Civil War.

Service
The regiment was organized in Staten Island, New York and was mustered in for a two-year enlistment on May 31, 1861.

The regiment was mustered out of service on June 9, 1863, and those men who had signed three year enlistments or who re-enlisted were transferred to the 121st New York on April 19, 1864.

Total strength and casualties
The regiment suffered 8 officers and 37 enlisted men who were killed in action or mortally wounded and 1 officer and 53 enlisted men who died of disease, for a total of 99. 
fatalities.

Commanders
 Colonel Francis Effingham Pinto

See also
List of New York Civil War regiments

Notes

References
The Civil War Archive

External links
New York State Military Museum and Veterans Research Center - Civil War - 32nd Infantry Regiment History, photographs, table of battles and casualties, and historical sketch for the 32nd New York Infantry Regiment.

Infantry 032
1861 establishments in New York (state)
Military units and formations established in 1861
Military units and formations disestablished in 1863